28 de Noviembre, written out as Veintiocho de Noviembre, is a town in southwestern Santa Cruz Province, Argentina. The town is near the border with Chile, not far from Puerto Natales. Its main economic activity is coal mining.

The town was officially founded on November 28, 1959, on the second anniversary of the adoption of the provincial constitution, when a decree merged several settlements into one town which was named after the date of foundation.

28 de Noviembre is the nearest town to Río Turbio Airport.

References

Populated places in Santa Cruz Province, Argentina
Populated places established in 1959
1959 establishments in Argentina